Tara Lyn Hart, born April 11, 1978 in Roblin, Manitoba, Canada, is a Canadian country music singer/songwriter.

Biography
Tara Lyn Hart has been singing since she was 5 years old. By the time she started junior high school, she was playing 80 dates a year, performing anywhere she could. When she turned 17, Hart entered and won a contest through which she was able to record two demos to be distributed to Canadian country radio. Hart worked with Danny Schur, who was Chantal Kreviazuk's manager at the time. Schur passed her recordings to Sony Music Canada's Mike Roth, which led to a recording contract with Epic Records on the eve of her 18th birthday and two weeks before her wedding. In 1998, Hart was named Billboard magazines Most Likely to Succeed.

Hart's self-titled debut album was released on October 5, 1999. The lead single, "Stuff That Matters," soared up the Canadian country singles chart, eventually peaking at an impressive No. 6. At the 2000 Juno Awards, Hart was nominated for Best Country Female Artist, and the all-genre Best New Solo Artist. In April 2000, she was invited to perform on the Grand Ole Opry. Hart won three awards at the 2000 Manitoba Association of Country Arts Awards - Female Vocalist, and both Song of the Year and Video of the Year for "Stuff That Matters." On June 9, 2000, Hart won two awards at RPM's Big Country Awards - Outstanding New Female Artist and Canadian Country Video of the Year for "Stuff That Matters." When the nominations were announced for the 2000 Canadian Country Music Association (CCMA) Awards, Hart had six nominations, the most for any artist. She won the FACTOR Rising Star Award at the September 11, 2000 ceremony. She picked up two more nominations at the 2000 Prairie Music Awards - Outstanding Country Recording and Outstanding Album by a Major Label. At the 2001 Juno Awards, Hart was again nominated for Best Country Female Artist. She also picked up a nomination for Female Vocalist of the Year at the 2001 CCMA Awards, competing against Lisa Brokop, Terri Clark, Carolyn Dawn Johnson and Michelle Wright. Meanwhile, her album continued to spawn successful singles such as "Save Me," "I Will Be Loving You" and "What He Used To Do." Hart capped off 2001 with a SOCAN award for "Save Me," a song she co-wrote with Hal Draper and David Quilico.

Hart began work on her second album in June 2003. The first single, "Happiness," was released in September. Before the album was complete, Hart decided to walk away from the project to spend more time with her husband and their three children. She began work on a musical comedy, "Miss Kitty's Holiday Extravaganza," which ran from October to December 2004. In 2010, Hart is releasing a six-song Christmas EP, Perfect Holiday, on November 30, 2010.

Discography

Albums

Extended plays

Singles

Music videos

Awards and nominations

References

External links
Tara Lyn Hart Fact Sheet
 

1978 births
Living people
Canadian women country singers
Epic Records artists
Columbia Records artists
Canadian Country Music Association Rising Star Award winners
21st-century Canadian women singers